Manhole is the first solo album by Grace Slick, released in 1974 by Grunt/RCA Records.

Background
The album is credited solely to Slick (she had previously recorded Sunfighter with Paul Kantner and Baron von Tollbooth & the Chrome Nun with Kantner and David Freiberg, both of whom co-produced Manhole). It was recorded in 1973, when Jefferson Airplane had stopped touring, and Jorma Kaukonen and Jack Casady were making the Hot Tuna album, The Phosphorescent Rat. All the members who would form Jefferson Starship in 1974 performed on this album, except for Papa John Creach. The album was conceived as a soundtrack to a movie (noted by the title of the second track, "Theme from the Movie Manhole"), although there was no such movie made. Grace drew all of the artwork for the album, and wrote on the cover "Child Type Odd Art by Grace."

Recording
Bob Mathews, engineer in the studio, has said that since there were words Slick wanted to be in Spanish, she waited around to six in the morning until the Mexican janitor appeared and would then ask him to translate her words while he emptied garbage cans.

Bob Mathews observed that though in her career she had always been quite disciplined, known for her reliability, at this time, "she was very much self-abused. She drank too much, smoked too much. She also shared my desire for particular drugs that kept us awake longer and allowed us to do more."

Reception
The album commercially underperformed, reaching No. 127 on the Billboard charts.

Track listing
Side one

Side two

Personnel
Grace Slick – vocals on all tracks except "It's Only Music", rhythm guitar on "Jay", piano on "Theme from the Movie Manhole".
Peter Kaukonen – bass on "Jay", lead acoustic guitar on "Jay", mandolin on "Theme from the Movie Manhole"
Steven Schuster – orchestra arrangement on "Theme from the Movie Manhole" and "Epic No. 38"
David Freiberg – vocals on "Theme from the Movie Manhole", "It's Only Music", and "Epic No. 38", rhythm guitar on "Theme from the Movie Manhole" and "¿Come Again? Toucan", piano on "¿Come Again? Toucan" and "It's Only Music", percussion on "¿Come Again? Toucan" and "It's Only Music", bass on "¿Come Again? Toucan" and "It's Only Music", organ on "It's Only Music", 12-string guitar on "It's Only Music"
Paul Kantner – vocals on "Theme from the Movie Manhole", "It's Only Music", and "Epic No. 38", 12-string guitar on "It's Only Music", rhythm guitar on "Epic No. 38", glass harmonica on "Epic No. 38"
David Crosby – vocals on "Theme from the Movie Manhole"
Ron Carter – bass on "Theme from the Movie Manhole"
Jack Casady – bass on "Theme from the Movie Manhole" and "It's Only Music"
Craig Chaquico – lead guitar on "Theme from the Movie Manhole", "¿Come Again? Toucan", and "Epic No. 38"
John Barbata – drums on "Theme from the Movie Manhole", "¿Come Again? Toucan", and "Epic No. 38"
Gary Duncan – lead guitar on "It's Only Music"
Pete Sears – piano on "Better Lying Down", bass on "Epic No. 38"
Keith Grant – synthesizer programming on "Epic No. 38"
London Symphony Orchestra – violins (John Georgiadis, Hans Geiger, Alan Traverse, Carlos Villa, Paul Scherman, Michael Jones, Jack Greenstone, John Ronayne, James Davis, Bernard Monshin, Fred Parrington, Denis McConnell), violas, (Kenneth Essex, John Coulling, John underwood, Alex Taylor), celli (Alan Dalziel, Bram Martin, Clive Anstee, Robin Firman), string basses (James Merrett, Keith Marjarom, Robin McGee, Chris Laurence), harp (David Snell), flutes (Jack Ellory, Chris Taylor), oboes (Terence Macdonagh, Philip Hill), bass clarinet (Frank Reidy), French horns (Andrew McGavin, Douglas Moore), trumpets (Michael Laird, George Whiting), bass trumpets (Raymond Premru, Harold Nash), bass trombone (Peter Harvey), guitar (Timothy Walker), percussion (Alan Hakin, Terence Emery, Eric Allen, Stan Barrett) on "Theme from the Movie Manhole"
Iain MacDonald Murray, Calum Innes, Cohn Graham, Angus McTavish, Tom Duncan, Jack Scott, Angus MacKay, William Stewart – bagpipes on "Epic No. 38"

Production
Grace Slick, David Freiberg, Paul Kantner – producers
Keith Grant – co-producer, recording engineer, mixdown engineer
Steven Schuster – co-producer
Pat Ieraci (Maurice) – production coordinator
Valeria Clausen, Mallory Earl, Bob Matthews – recording engineers
Sidney Margo – orchestra contractor
Recorded at Wally Heider's, San Francisco
Mastered at the Lacquer Channel, Sausalito

Notes

References

1974 debut albums
Albums recorded at Wally Heider Studios
Grace Slick albums
Grunt Records albums